Duke Lie of Jin (died 389 BC) was from 415 to 389 BC the titular ruler of the State of Jin during the beginning of the Warring States period of ancient China.  His ancestral name was Ji, given name Zhi, and Duke Lie was his posthumous title.  After his father Duke You of Jin died in 416 BC, Marquess Wen of Wei installed Duke Lie on the throne.

Since 453 BC, near the end of the reign of Duke Chu of Jin, the state of Jin had already been partitioned into three de facto states of Han, Zhao, and Wei.  The only territories under the Duke's control were the traditional capitals Jiang and Quwo.  In 403 BC, during Duke Lie's reign, King Weilie of Zhou officially proclaimed Han, Zhao, and Wei vassal states.

Duke Lie was the titular Duke of Jin for 27 years.  He died in 389 BC and was succeeded by his son Duke Huan of Jin, also called Duke Xiao in the Records of the Grand Historian.

References

Year of birth unknown
Monarchs of Jin (Chinese state)
5th-century BC Chinese monarchs
4th-century BC Chinese monarchs
389 BC deaths